Frans van Lent (born 1955) is a Dutch photographer and performance artist.

Van Lent was born in Rotterdam. He received his education at the Academie voor Beeldende Vorming, Tilburg, The Netherlands (1974-1979) and MahKU, Utrecht, The Netherlands (2012-2014).

Since 2000 he has been a teacher at the Willem de Kooning Academy, Rotterdam, The Netherlands.

Until ± 2000 his work consisted of performance related staged photography. In 2000, he shifted his focus towards process documentation and experience based performance art. In 2014, Van Lent graduated with an MA in Fine Art from the MaHKU, during which time he developed the concept of Unnoticed Art. In the same year, van Lent initiated and organised the first Unnoticed Art Festival in Haarlem, The Netherlands, and started the online free approachable database TheConceptBank.org. In 2015, he published the book Unnoticed Art with Jap Sam Books and started the TheParallelShow performance series. As of January 2018, van Lent organised 10 occasions with varying groups of performance artists in 10 different art venues in Europe and the USA. In March 2018, Van Lent edited and published TheParallelShow book, with contributions from all the project's participating artists.

References

1955 births
Living people
Photographers from Rotterdam
Academic staff of Willem de Kooning Academy